Youssouf Mulumbu (born 25 January 1987) is a Congolese former professional footballer who played as a midfielder.

Mulumbu came through Paris Saint-Germain's youth academy. He began playing for Paris Saint-Germain B in 2004 and was promoted to the first-team in 2006. He was sent on two loan deals to Amiens and West Bromwich Albion, respectively, ultimately signing a permanent deal with the latter. He played there several years, winning the club's player of the year award for 2011. In 2015, he moved to newly-promoted Premier League club Norwich City, and he played for Scottish clubs Celtic and Kilmarnock between 2017 and 2021. Afterwards, he returned to Congo to play for Saint-Éloi Lupopo.

Born in Kinshasa, Zaire, but growing up in France, Mulumbu represented France at various youth levels, before making his international debut in 2008 aged 21. He shortly withdrew from the national team citing a "lack of professionalism" in 2009. He returned in 2012, and helped the team finish in third place during the 2015 Africa Cup of Nations.

Club career

Paris Saint-Germain
Mulumbu moved to France from Zaire at young age with his family, and grew up in the town of Épinay-sous-Sénart, a suburb of Paris. He began playing for the Paris Saint-Germain Academy at age 13. On 22 October 2006, he made his Ligue 1 debut under head coach Guy Lacombe, at 19 years and 10 months in a match against Auxerre. He signed his first professional contract with Paris Saint-Germain on 13 November 2006.

During the 2007–08 season, he was on loan at Amiens in Ligue 2, scoring once in 29 appearances.

West Bromwich Albion
It was reported by the French media on 26 January 2009 that he joined Premier League team West Bromwich Albion on a trial basis. On 2 February 2009, the January transfer deadline day, he joined them on loan with a view to a permanent deal at the end of the season. Mulumbu's first term at The Hawthorns was interrupted by injuries and he had to wait until April to make his Premier League debut, coming on as a sub in a 2–2 draw at Portsmouth. He signed for West Brom permanently on a one-year contract for a fee of £175,000 on 10 July 2009.

He was named West Brom's Player of the Year by both the club and the fans at the end of the season, and signed his third contract extension in 13 months on 25 July 2011, tying himself to the club until 2015 (with the option of an extra year).

On 15 March 2014, Mulumbu scored a crucial winner for West Brom in a 2–1 victory against Swansea City at the Liberty Stadium, giving Pepe Mel his first win as head coach.

Norwich City
In June 2015, it was announced that Mulumbu would sign on a free-transfer for newly promoted Norwich City on 1 July 2015.

On 3 August 2015, Norwich announced that Mulumbu suffered a broken metatarsal in a friendly against Brentford which would require surgery and sideline him for several weeks, ruling him out of the start of the season. He would finally make his debut on 27 October in a League Cup game against Everton, which Norwich lost on penalties after a 1–1 draw. He made his Premier League debut a few days later on 31 October in a 2–1 defeat to Manchester City. However, with Jonny Howson, Alexander Tettey and Graham Dorrans preferred in the centre of midfield, Mulumbu would ultimately be confined to only five league starts and two appearances as a substitute in the 2015–16 season, plus one appearance in the FA Cup, and the season would end with Norwich relegated back to the Championship.

Mulumbu remained with Norwich for the 2016–17 season but again found his opportunities for first team action restricted. His last appearance for Norwich came on 11 February 2017 in a 5–1 win over Nottingham Forest. On 2 May, it was announced that Mulumbu was one of seven players who would be released by Norwich when their contracts expired at the end of the season.

Kilmarnock
On 22 November 2017, it was announced that Mulumbu had signed for Scottish Premiership club Kilmarnock until the end of the 2017–18 season. Mulumbu reunited with manager Steve Clarke, who had also managed him at West Bromwich. He scored his first goal for Kilmarnock in a 1–0 win against Celtic on 3 February 2018. On 13 July 2018, Clarke said that Mulumbu had left Kilmarnock and was not expected to return to the club.

Celtic
On 31 August 2018, Mulumbu signed a two-year deal with Celtic. Mulumbu was loaned back to Kilmarnock on 31 January 2019, until the end of the 2018–19 season, and played 12 times in his second spell with the Ayrshire club. In June 2019, Mulumbu left Celtic after the club activated a break clause in his contract. Mulumbu had made three appearances for the Glasgow side.

Return to Kilmarnock
After a year out of football, Mulumbu trained with Kilmarnock during August 2020. On 28 August, he made his return to the club on a six-month deal. On 11 January 2021, Mulumbu agreed a contract extension to remain at the club until the end of the 2020–21 season. He left Kilmarnock in May 2021 to move to France.

Saint-Éloi Lupopo
On 31 July 2021, Mulumbu signed a one-year contract with Saint-Éloi Lupopo, marking his return to Congo. He left the club as his contract expired in August 2022, after finishing third in the national championship and putting in strong performances as a key player in the team.

International career
Mulumbu was formerly a member of the France under-20 and under-21 teams. He earned his first cap for Congo DR national football team against Algeria on 26 March 2008. In 2009, Mulumbu decided to boycott international football after he claimed his national team lacked professionalism. On 23 September 2011, he retired from international duties, quoting "numerous problems we were facing with some authorities within the DR Congo Football Federation". However, in July 2012, he decided to revoke this decision, and made himself available for the Congo DR national football team once again.

Personal life
Mulumbu was born in Kinshasa, Zaire. He is a Muslim.

Honours

National
DR Congo
Africa Cup of Nations bronze: 2015

Career statistics

References

External links

1987 births
Living people
Footballers from Kinshasa
Democratic Republic of the Congo footballers
Democratic Republic of the Congo international footballers
French footballers
France youth international footballers
France under-21 international footballers
French sportspeople of Democratic Republic of the Congo descent
Democratic Republic of the Congo Muslims
Association football midfielders
Paris Saint-Germain F.C. players
Amiens SC players
West Bromwich Albion F.C. players
Norwich City F.C. players
Kilmarnock F.C. players
Celtic F.C. players
Ligue 1 players
Ligue 2 players
Championnat National 2 players
Premier League players
Scottish Professional Football League players
English Football League players
Expatriate footballers in England
Expatriate footballers in Scotland
2013 Africa Cup of Nations players
2015 Africa Cup of Nations players
2017 Africa Cup of Nations players
2019 Africa Cup of Nations players
FC Saint-Éloi Lupopo players
Black French sportspeople